Christopher Charles Brantley (born December 12, 1970) is a former American football wide receiver in the National Football League.

Brantley graduated in 1989 from Teaneck High School in Teaneck, New Jersey and was inducted into the Teaneck Athletic Hall of Fame in April 2011. He played college football for Rutgers University where he set many records and is currently in the Rutgers Football Hall of Fame. He was the school's all-time leader in touchdown receptions with 17, and second all-time in receptions with 144. He was drafted in the 4th round (108th overall pick) in the 1994 NFL Draft by the Los Angeles Rams. He later signed as a free agent with the Buffalo Bills.

Brantley has one daughter, Kayla Brantley, and resides in Jersey City, New Jersey. He is currently a sports agent at LIFT Sports Management and represents numerous NBA basketball players as well as football players. He served as Athletic Director of the Torah Academy of Bergen County for the 2017–2018 academic year.

References

1970 births
Living people
People from Bergenfield, New Jersey
Sportspeople from Rahway, New Jersey
Players of American football from New Jersey
American football wide receivers
American football return specialists
Rutgers Scarlet Knights football players
Los Angeles Rams players
Buffalo Bills players
Scottish Claymores players
New Jersey Gladiators players
New York/New Jersey Hitmen players
American sports agents
Sportspeople from Bergen County, New Jersey
Teaneck High School alumni